Øyvind Tveter (born 28 March 1954) is a former Norwegian speed skater who competed internationally in the 1970s and 1980s. At the 1980 Winter Olympics in Lake Placid he finished 5th in the 5000 metres and 5th in the 10000 metres.

Tveter's elder brother Bjørn was also a speed skater who competed in international championships and in the Olympics.

References

External links

Norwegian male speed skaters
Speed skaters at the 1980 Winter Olympics
Olympic speed skaters of Norway
1954 births
Living people